Raymond Edward Boettcher was a fullback in the National Football League. He played with the Racine Tornadoes during the 1926 NFL season.

References

1900 births
1965 deaths
American football fullbacks
Lawrence Vikings football players
Racine Tornadoes players
People from Dodge County, Wisconsin
People from Watertown, Wisconsin
Players of American football from Wisconsin